Hereward College is a national further education college specialising in skills for independent living and employment for young people with disabilities and additional needs. It is situated on Bramston Crescent, Tile Hill, Coventry, West Midlands, England and opened in 1972.

The college accepts learners with a whole range of additional and special needs, including physical disabilities, communication disorders and learning difficulties on both a day and residential basis. It has facilities for providing speech and language therapy, physiotherapy, occupational therapy, nursing support and independent learning support.

Hereward provides its learners with a varied curriculum that focuses on skills for independent living and employment. The college offers a range of BTEC courses in subjects including art and design, business, creative media, hospitality, ICT, music, performing arts, sport as well as GCSE English and maths.

The college also manages a supported internship programme with a range of employment partners which enables young people (aged 16–24) with an education, health and care plan to gain experience in the work place within a supported environment.  It holds the FairTrain Gold Level Work Experience Quality Standard.

Alumni
 Jane Campbell, Baroness Campbell of Surbiton (born 1959)
 Nabil Shaban, Founder of Graeae Theatre Company
 Bert Massie (CBE), Disability Rights Campaigner

References

External links
 Official website
 

Education in Coventry
Buildings and structures in Coventry
Further education colleges in the West Midlands (county)